Kim Min-hee (born March 1, 1982) is a South Korean actress and model. She rose to international fame for her role as Lady Hideko in Park Chan-wook's 2016 film The Handmaiden. Since then, she has solely acted in the films of her partner, Hong Sang-soo. She won the Silver Bear for Best Actress for her performance in Hong's 2017 film On the Beach at Night Alone.

In 2020, The New York Times ranked Kim sixteenth on its list of "The 25 Greatest Actors of the 21st Century".

Career
Kim Min-hee began modeling when she was in middle school, and soon appeared as a cover girl in teen magazines. In 1999, she was cast in the campus drama School 2 as a rebellious high school girl, which launched her to stardom. She became a popular young star at barely 20 years old, appearing in TV dramas and movies. However, a string of poor acting performances brought her negative criticism. Critics and viewers disparagingly called her an "attractive but blank actress," more famous for being a fashion icon and actor Lee Jung-jae's then-girlfriend.

In 2006, after reading the synopsis of TV series Goodbye Solo, Kim knew that she wanted the role of Mi-ri more than anything, saying "I was ready to do anything to play her." She begged renowned screenwriter Noh Hee-kyung to cast her, and though Noh turned her down five times, Kim would not give up, and her determination eventually convinced Noh to see her hidden potential. Vowing to start over from the bottom, Kim went through strict acting training which included basic vocal and respiratory exercises; she got a hold of the script before anyone else, and continued to analyze the role and practice every day. Kim said that until Goodbye Solo, she hadn't been sure what to do with the rest of her life, but the drama made her feel that acting was her true calling, like she'd "finally opened up the first page of the textbook." She received good reviews for her performance, and despite the drama's low ratings, the role transformed her career.

Her succeeding movie roles helped solidify her career reinvention, beginning with 2008's Hellcats (also known by its Korean title I Like It Hot or Some Like It Hot), a light-hearted comedy that explored the lives and loves of three women at different stages of womanhood. Kim played an aspiring screenwriter in her twenties who's agonizing over her insecure career and shaky romance with a deadbeat musician boyfriend. Reviews praised her "compelling performance," and she later won Best Actress at the Baeksang Arts Awards and the Busan Film Critics Awards.

Kim then joined the all-star cast of Actresses (2009), a semi-improvisational mockumentary directed by E J-yong (whom she had previously worked with in Asako in Ruby Shoes). Set during a Vogue Korea photo shoot, Kim gets upset in the film over a remark by a staffer that men don't find skinny women like her attractive, as compared to her more voluptuous costar Kim Ok-bin. A supporting turn as a reporter in conspiracy film Moby Dick followed in 2011.

Kim further stretched the limits of her acting range in psychological thriller Helpless (2012), adapted from Miyabe Miyuki's novel All She Was Worth (in Japanese, "one-way train/fire chariot to hell"). She said she had absolute trust in director Byun Young-joo and never even checked the monitors, and Byun was likewise complimentary, saying, "I ended up adding more scenes for her to act because she was just exceptional. She knew what she was doing, and knew she was able to pull it off. She was rarely nervous throughout the production. She's got no fear and is always confident." Kim said the role gave her a chance to show what she was capable of as an actress, adding, "I feel differently about acting now. I often feel a tremendous sense of achievement and really enjoy doing this job." Displaying a striking screen presence as a mysterious girl who disappears without a trace while her bewildered fiancé discovers a trail of falsified information, Kim received several acting nominations and won Best Actress at the Buil Film Awards.

After her contract with Lee Byung-hun's agency BH Entertainment ended in late 2012, Kim signed with Management SOOP, which also handles the career of her friend Gong Hyo-jin.

In 2013, Kim again earned raves for her performance in Very Ordinary Couple. Unlike the typical romantic comedy, the relationship drama told a more realistic story of an on-and-off couple of three years. During her acceptance speech as Best Actress at the 2013 Baeksang Arts Awards, Kim thanked her costar Lee Min-ki and director Roh Deok, who "helped shape (her) character Young on the screen." Action-noir No Tears for the Dead followed in 2014, in which she played a grieving woman who becomes a hitman's target.

Kim next starred in Hong Sang-soo's critically acclaimed film Right Now, Wrong Then (2015), which won her Best Actress at the Busan Film Critics Awards. Kim shot to international stardom for her performance in the award-winning film The Handmaiden, Park Chan-wook's 2016 film adaptation of Fingersmith set in 1930s Korea. Park called her "the most coveted a-list actress at the moment."

In 2017, Kim became the first Korean actress to win the Silver Bear for Best Actress at the Berlin International Film Festival for her performance in the film On the Beach at Night Alone. In 2018, she starred in Grass and Hotel by the River.

Kim starred in The Woman Who Ran (2020) which won the Silver Bear for Best Director at the 70th Berlin International Film Festival. In 2020, The New York Times ranked Kim sixteenth on its list of "The 25 Greatest Actors of the 21st Century".

Personal life

In June 2016, Kim was reported to be having an affair with Hong Sang-soo, the married director of the film Right Now, Wrong Then, in which she starred as the lead actress in 2015. At the Seoul premiere of On the Beach at Night Alone in March 2017, Kim and Hong openly admitted their affair.

The controversy was allegedly the reason why Management SOOP decided not to renew Kim's management contract, which ended in early 2016. She also lost endorsement deals, including that of a cosmetics company.

Filmography

Film

Television series

Variety show

Awards

References

External links

1982 births
Living people
21st-century South Korean actresses
South Korean film actresses
South Korean television actresses
Dankook University alumni
Silver Bear for Best Actress winners
Best Actress Paeksang Arts Award (film) winners